Graham Nesbitt (born 18 February 1983 in Plymouth, Devon, England) is a professional British basketball player, and currently plays for the Plymouth Raiders in the British Basketball League.

Nesbitt spent a few years overseas in the United States with the foreign exchange program. He lived in Lebo, Kansas and played his senior year of high school basketball as a Lebo Wolf. Also played tennis at ICC in Independence, Kansas.

The 6-foot 5 forward attended Indiana University-Purdue University Fort Wayne and, following a brief spell in 2003/04 with Solent Stars, is now in his rookie season as a professional basketball player with his hometown team the Plymouth Raiders.

References

1983 births
Living people
British Basketball League players
English men's basketball players
Junior college men's basketball players in the United States
Sportspeople from Plymouth, Devon
Plymouth Raiders players